Allen Zadoff is an American author of young adult fiction. He is mainly known for his young adult novels including the series Wild & Chance and The Unknown Assassin/Boy Nobody. His novel Food, Girls, and Other Things I Can’t Have was awarded the 2010 Sid Fleischman Humor Award from the Society of Children's Book Writers and Illustrators. and was included in Popular Young Adult Paperbacks of 2012 by YALSA. It has also been optioned for a feature film. His other novels for young adults include My Life, the Theater, and Other Tragedies and Since You Left Me. He is also the author of The Unknown Assassin books from Little Brown Books for Young Readers.

Background  
Allen Zadoff was born in Boston, Massachusetts and went on to live in upstate New York, Manhattan, Tokyo, and Los Angeles.  A former stage director, he is a graduate of American Repertory Theater’s Institute for Advanced Theater Training at Harvard University  He is also an alumnus of the Warner Bros. Comedy Writers Workshop in Hollywood. Mr. Zadoff currently lives in Los Angeles where he works as a writer and writing teacher.

Wild & Chance (Series) 
Zadoff's new middle grade series, Wild & Chance, will be published by Disney-Hyperion beginning Spring 2020.

Book Description:

Sit. Speak. Survive the chase.

A girl wakes up trapped on a sinking ship with no memory of who she is and nothing but her instinct to survive. She fights her way to freedom, only to discover two incredible facts: She is a dog, and she can understand human speech. She soon befriends a thirteen-year-old boy named Chance who gives her a name of her own—Wild.

But Wild and Chance find themselves running for their lives, pursued by relentless Animal Control officers. Joined by a mysterious hacker girl named Junebug, the unlikely trio fights for survival while trying to solve the mystery of Wild's extraordinary strength, super intelligence, and high-tech collar.

Equal parts heart-pounding action and heartfelt journey, Wild & Chance grabs the reader from page one and never lets go.

The Unknown Assassin (Series)
I Am the Weapon (Book 1) - June 11, 2013
I Am the Mission (Book 2) - June 17, 2014
I Am the Traitor (Book 3) - June 9, 2015 

First published as Boy Nobody by Little Brown Books for Young Readers (US) and Orchard Books (UK) on June 11, 2013, the paperback edition was renamed I AM THE WEAPON in the United States. The book received starred reviews from Publishers Weekly and VOYA, and foreign language rights have been sold in over two dozen countries. In addition, Sony Pictures has optioned the feature film rights to the series with Will Smith's Overbrook Entertainment set to produce. It was named a 2014 Top Ten Books for Reluctant Young Adult readers by YALSA and a Finalist for Best Young Adult Novel in the 2014 International Thriller Awards.

Book Description:

He is nothing. The mission is everything.

They needed the perfect soldier: one who could function in every situation without fear, sympathy or anger; who could assassinate strangers and then walk away emotionally unscathed. So they made Boy Nobody-a teen with no name or history. The perfect soldier.

Boy Nobody is the perennial new kid in school, the one few notice and nobody thinks much about. He shows up in a new high school, in a new town, under a new name, makes few friends and doesn't stay long. Just long enough for someone in his new friend's family to die—of "natural causes." Mission accomplished, Boy Nobody disappears, and moves on to the next target.

But when he's assigned to the mayor of New York City, things change. The daughter seems so much like him; the mayor smells like his father. And when memories and questions surface, the Program is watching. Because somewhere, deep inside Boy Nobody, is somebody: the kid he once was, the teen who wants normal things like a real home and parents, a young man who wants out. And who just might want those things badly enough to sabotage The Program's mission.

Food, Girls, and Other Things I Can’t Have (novel)

Food, Girls, and Other Things I Can't Have is a young adult novel published by Egmont in September 2009  and distributed by Random House. It received widespread critical acclaim including a starred review in VOYA that described it as "a must-read for adolescents and adults alike." The novel also won the 2010 Sid Fleischman Humor Award from the Society of Children's Book Writers and Illustrators and was a finalist for the Georgia Peach Book Awards and a nominee for the Missouri Gateway Readers Awards.. The paperback edition of Food, Girls was published on February 22, 2011. It has subsequently been reprinted.

Book Description:

Life used to be so simple for Andrew Zansky—hang with the Model U.N. guys, avoid gym class, and eat and eat and eat.  He’s used to not fitting in: into his family, his sports-crazed school, or his size 48 pants.

But not anymore.  Andrew just met April, the new girl at school and the instant love of his life!  He wants to find a way to win her over, but how?  When O. Douglas, the heartthrob quarterback and high school legend, saves him from getting beaten up by the school bully, Andrew sees his chance to get in with the football squad.

Is it possible to reinvent yourself in the middle of high school? Andrew is willing to try. But he’s going to have to make some changes. Fast.

Can a funny fat kid be friends with a football superstar?  Can he win over the Girl of his Dreams?  Can he find a way to get his Mom and Dad back together?

How far should you go to be the person you really want to be?

Andrew is about to find out.

My Life, the Theater, and Other  Tragedies (novel)
The hardcover edition of My Life, the Theater, and Other Tragedies was published by Egmont and distributed by Random House on May 10, 2011.

Book Description:

High school sophomore Adam Zeigler, who lost his father to a sudden accident two years ago, thinks the best way to live life is behind the spotlight. As a member of the theater crew, he believes he's achieved it all when he wins the coveted job of spotlight operator. But that was before a young actress, Summer, appeared in his view. Instantly smitten, Adam is determined to win her over. But to do so, he'll have to defy his best friend and break the golden rule of his school: techies and actors don't mix.

Set against the backdrop of a high school production of A Midsummer Night's Dream, Zadoff's latest is a bromance, a love story, and theater story in one. The politics of love and high school collide as Adam struggles to find the courage to step out of the shadows and into the light..

Since You Left Me (novel)
The hardcover edition of Since You Left Me was published by Egmont on August 28, 2012.

Book Description:

Everyone believes in something. Almost everyone.

For Sanskrit Aaron Zuckerman, it isn't easy to believe.  Especially when all the people you care about leave.

His Dad left after the divorce. The love of his life left in second grade.  His best friend in Jewish school found God and practically left the planet. Now his yoga teacher Mom is falling in love with her spiritual guru, and she’s threatening to leave, too.

In a desperate attempt to keep his family together, Sanskrit tells just one small lie. And for a while it seems to be working. Because people start coming back. Sanskrit might even get the family he always wanted.

There’s just one little thing in his way.  The truth.

Against the setting of modern-day Los Angeles, YA author Allen Zadoff presents a funny and heartbreaking novel about the search for love—and meaning—in a world where everyone is looking for something to hang onto.

Hungry: Lessons Learned on the Journey from Fat to Thin (memoir)

Hungry is a critically acclaimed adult memoir published by Da Capo Press/Perseus Books in October 2007. In a 2007 review, the Los Angeles Times called it "gentle, funny...uncommonly appealing."

Book Description:

Allen Zadoff spent years reasoning that a big, healthy man should have a big, healthy appetite and that his rapidly increasing girth was nothing to be alarmed about. But by the time he hit 350 pounds at age 28, it became clear that what started out as a seemingly manageable weight problem was rapidly destroying his life.

Following years of see-saw dieting and guilt inducing food binges, and desperate to find a new way of living that would make him thin, Zadoff had a breakthrough. Instead of employing the diet du jour and other weight loss fads, he began to focus less on what he ate and more on the physical and emotional underpinnings of what he came to understand as a disease. The pounds melted away, and in the process he gained a whole new life.

Sharing his incredible journey both up and down the scale with bite-sized portions of savory prose, Zadoff blends his personal story with surprising strategies for weight-loss success that engage the heart and mind rather than the calorie counter. Courageous, candid, wise, and often hilarious, Hungry is sure to inspire foodies and non-foodies alike to muster the power to change.

References

External links 
 Official Website

Living people
American children's writers
American male writers
Institute for Advanced Theater Training, Harvard University alumni
Year of birth missing (living people)